Kärnten läuft is an annual half marathon road running race around the lake Wörthersee. It starts in Velden am Wörther See and ends in Klagenfurt. It has been held every year since 2002 and typically takes place in August.

Prior to the launch of the competition, a local athletics club, the Klagenfurter Leichtathletik Club, held the Klagenfurter Marathon in the region. It hosted the Austrian national championship race in 1999 and 2001. It was disbanded upon the creation of the Kärnten läuft.

It is one of the most prominent half marathon competitions in Austria, alongside the Mondsee Half Marathon.

Past winners
Key:

Sources

References

External links
Official website 

Half marathons
International athletics competitions hosted by Austria
Recurring sporting events established in 2002
2002 establishments in Austria